Integrated within the adapted sport section of FC Porto, the goalball team competes in the Portuguese National Goalball Championship organized by ANDDVIS (National Association of Sport for the Visually Impaired).

Guided by Rúben Leonel (manager) and with the coordination of Joana Teixeira (responsible for the section), the athletes perform their training and furthermore development at the Dragão Arena.

History

Creation, purposes and first steps
With the 124th anniversary celebrations of the club taking place, chairman Jorge Nuno Pinto da Costa announced the creation of a goalball team in order to continue the service provided throughout the section to athletes with limitations (in this case with visual impairment) so they could practice and enjoy the pleasure of playing the sport. A cooperation was established with CCD Misericórdia Porto (House of Culture and Sport of the Workers of the Santa Casa da Misericórdia do Porto) who already had a team competing in the National Championship, thus cementing goals to develop young athletes and grant them with better working conditions for approaching a higher performance level. The defined main purpose is the growth and projection of the sport, accompanied with the intention of placing players from the squad in representation of the Portugal goalball national team.

The goalball squad for the opening season was composed of Vítor Caixeiro, Diogo Azevedo, Carlos Coutinho, Márcio Carneiro, Fábio Oliveira and João Macedo. They debuted in the National Championship with a 10–5 loss against Castêlo da Maia which prompted manager Lara Teixeira to explain that despite the bad start, the players were still in an adjusting and learning phase that was only going to be surpassed with hard work. Following the initial blunder the team managed to engage itself into achieving four consecutive wins, three for the championship and the elimination of CCD Misericórdia Porto from the Portuguese Cup in a 10–3 victory. A month later however, reached an outcome that dismissed their championship aspirations, after conceding two defeats against Sporting CP (A and B squads); both matches were disputed in the multi-sport pavilion of José Alvalade Stadium. The team clinched two victories in the final fixtures, secured a 4th place on the overall table standings and youngster Fábio Oliveira became the team top goalscorer for the competition having netted 24 goals. Porto concluded the competitive season with two defeats against Castêlo da Maia and AJ Pina, dictating their elimination from the Portuguese Cup.

The following season, Tiago Mendes replaced Lara Teixeira as the new manager and João Sousa joined the squad from CCD Misericórdia Porto. Prior to the start of any official competition they participated in a joint training session alongside Porto's handball team, with both sides sharing their experiences across two different sporting realities. Afterwards, they initiated the championship first round with a victory against CA Cultural. In the succeeding round, Porto was defeated by Sporting CP but assured a win against ACAPO Lisboa. On 30 March 2019, they managed to beat rivals Sporting CP for the first time with a 8–7 victory in the Portuguese Cup first round. Subsequently, the team won all remaining championship matches while also achieving another victory in the Portuguese Cup; they improved on their previous season results with a 2nd place on the standings and Fábio Oliveira stood out again as the squad top goalscorer with 21 goals in the championship. At the end of the season, Porto eliminated CD Cova da Piedade from the Portuguese Cup in a 12–2 victory and effectively reached their first final, where they ended as runner-ups after losing versus Sporting CP.

Portugal national team contributions
The first major competition in which Porto players have been called to represent the Portugal national team was the 2018 IBSA Goalball European Championship B in Poland. Lead by Timo Laitinen, the squad achieved an historical 5th place and was granted permanency on the European Division B.

Club athletes in representation of the national team:

2018 Berlin Cup Goalball Tournament: Fábio Oliveira, João Macedo and Vítor Caixeiro
2018 IBSA Goalball European Championship B: Fábio Oliveira and João Macedo
2019 European Para Youth Games: Fábio Oliveira, João Macedo and João Sousa
2019 FEDC International Goalball Tournament: Fábio Oliveira, João Macedo and João Sousa

Seasons overview
Note: Porto score is always listed first

Current squad
The following players compose the squad for the 2019–20 season

Notes

References

Further reading
Magazines

Newspapers

External links
Associação Nacional de Desporto para Deficientes Visuais (in Portuguese)
Federação Portuguesa de Desporto para Pessoas com Deficiência (in Portuguese)
Comité Paralímpico de Portugal (in Portuguese)

FC Porto
European national goalball teams